Holy Cross School may refer to:

Places

Canada
 Holy Cross Catholic Secondary School (St. Catharines), Ontario
 Holy Cross Catholic Secondary School, Kingston, Ontario
 Holy Cross High School (Saskatoon), Saskatchewan
 Holy Cross Regional High School, Surrey, British Columbia
 Holy Cross Secondary School (Peterborough), Ontario

India
 Holy Cross Convent High School, Thane, Maharashtra
 Holy Cross High School (Kurla), Mumbai, Maharashtra
 Holy Cross School (Najafgarh), New Delhi
 Holy Cross School, Ballia, Uttar Pradesh
 Holy Cross School, Bokaro, Bokaro Steel City, Jharkhand

United Kingdom
 Holy Cross (Belfast), Northern Ireland
 Holy Cross Catholic High School, Chorley, Lancashire, England
 Holy Cross College (UK), Bury, Greater Manchester, England
 Holy Cross High School, Hamilton, South Lanarkshire, Scotland
 Holy Cross RC Primary School, Bristol, England
 Holy Cross Preparatory School, Kingston upon Thames, England
 Holy Cross School, New Malden, Kingston upon Thames, England

United States

 Holy Cross High School (Connecticut), Waterbury, Connecticut
 Holy Cross High School (River Grove, Illinois)
 Cathedral High School (Indianapolis), Indiana
 Holy Cross High School (Covington, Kentucky)
 Holy Cross High School (Louisville), Kentucky
 Holy Cross School (New Orleans), Louisiana
 Academy of the Holy Cross, Kensington, Maryland
 Hellenic College Holy Cross Greek Orthodox School of Theology, Brookline, Massachusetts
 Holy Cross Catholic School, Marine City, Michigan, a K-8 school
 Holy Cross High School (Marine City, Michigan)
 Holy Cross High School (New Jersey), Delran, New Jersey
 Holy Cross School, Bronx, New York
 Holy Cross School (Manhattan), New York
 Holy Cross High School (Queens), New York
 Holy Cross School (Philadelphia), Pennsylvania
 Holy Cross High School (Pennsylvania), Dunmore, Pennsylvania
 Holy Cross High School (San Antonio, Texas)
 Holy Cross Regional Catholic School (Lynchburg, Virginia)

Elsewhere
 Holy Cross College, Ryde, New South Wales, Australia
 Holy Cross Girls' High School (Dhaka), Bangladesh
 Holy Cross High School (Bandura), Bangladesh
 Holy Cross School, Henderson, New Zealand
 Holy Cross High School, Philips, Bukidnon, Philippines
 Holy Cross High School (Cape Town), the Western Cape
 Holy Cross School (Papatoetoe), New Zealand

See also
 HCHS (disambiguation)
 HCS (disambiguation)
 Holy Cross (disambiguation)
 Holy Cross College (disambiguation)
 Holy Cross Convent School (disambiguation)